Bugema University (BMU) is a private, co-educational Ugandan university affiliated with the Seventh-day Adventist Church. It is a part of the Seventh-day Adventist education system, the world's second largest Christian school system.

Location
The university is on land that measures , in Kalagala sub-county, Bamunanika county, Luweero District in the Central Region of Uganda. The coordinates of Bugema University campus are 0°34'11.0"N, 32°38'31.0"E (Latitude:0.569722; Longitude:32.641944).

History
The institution started in 1948 as a training school for teachers and pastors for the Seventh-day Adventist Church in East Africa. At that time it was called Bugema Missionary Training School. Later, the name changed to Bugema Missionary College and then to Bugema Adventist College.

In 1976 Bugema Adventist College received authorization from the Uganda Ministry of Education and the General Conference of Seventh-day Adventists to offer a BTh degree. The college had applied to offer a BA in Theology, but the Ministry of Education denied the application because at that time only Makerere University was permitted to offer academic degrees. There were about 35 students in the program. The professors were Pastor and Mrs. Villagomez, and Pastor Gary Fordham.  After President Idi Amin banned the Seventh-day Adventist church in 1977, the program was temporarily moved to Nairobi where the first degree students graduated with a BTh degree in 1978. The campus was then relocated to the church's youth camp (at Watamu just north of Mombasa) until Amin fled Uganda. While the college was at Watamu, Reuben Mugerwa finished his graduate degree at Andrews University and joined the faculty. The college was then moved back to the Bugema campus.

The college expanded. By the late 1980s curricula for Business and Education were added. In 1994, Bugema Adventist College changed its status from "college" to "university". In 1997, Bugema University was granted a tertiary institution license from the Ministry of Education and Sports.

Academic divisions
Bugema University is composed of the following schools:

School of Computing & Informatics

 Department of Systems Engineering
 Department of Information Systems
 Department of Network and Cybersecurity

School of Business
 Department of Accounting and Finance
Department of Management

School of Social Sciences
 Department of Developmental Studies
 Department of Social Work
 Department of Theology and Religious Studies

School of Education
 Department of Arts
 Department of Science
 Department of Languages

School of Natural Sciences
Department of life and physical sciences
Department of Agriculture
Department of Food and Human Nutrition

School of Graduate Studies
Bugema University's School of Graduate Studies is affiliated with the University of Eastern Africa, Baraton in Kenya with some of the postgraduate courses. The school is also affiliated with Central Luzon State University with some of the postgraduate courses and serves as a center of e-learning on some Doctoral programs offered at Central Luzon State University in the Philippines.

Academic courses
The academic courses offered at BU include the following:

Undergraduate degree programs
Bachelor of Business Administration in Accounting 
Bachelor of Business Administration in Finance 
Bachelor of Business Administration in Marketing
Bachelor of Business Administration in Management
Bachelor of Business Administration in Office Administration
Bachelor of Business Administration in Economics
Bachelor of Business Administration in Business Information Systems
Bachelor of Business Administration in International Trade
Bachelor of Business Administration in Entrepreneurship
Bachelor of Arts with Education
Bachelor of Science with Education 
Bachelor of Arts in Development Studies
Bachelor of Science in Counseling
Bachelor of Social Work and Social Administration
Bachelor of Theology
Bachelor of Arts in Religious Studies

Postgraduate degree programs
Master of Business Administration
Master of Science in Information Systems
Master of Science in Software Engineering and Application Development
Master of Science in Network Security
Master of Science in Counseling
Master of Arts in Education Management
Master of Arts in Development Studies
Master of Arts in English Literature
Master of Science in Education
Master of Professional Studies in Education
Master of Science in Rural Development
Master of Professional Studies in Rural Development
Master in Local Government Management
Doctor of Philosophy in Developmental Education
Doctor of Philosophy in Rural Development
Doctor of Philosophy in Developmental Communication

Diploma courses
 Diploma in Accounting
 Diploma in Marketing
 Diploma in Office Administration
 Diploma in Information Technology
 Diploma in Education
Diploma in Humana Resource Management
Diploma in Procurement and Supply Chain Management
Diploma in Office Administration and Secretarial Studies

Short certificate courses
 Certificate in Small Business Computer Networks
 Certificate in Office Automation and Data management
 Certificate in Computer Repair and Maintenance
 Certificate in Information Technology (For 2 years)
 Certificate in Nursing (For 2 and a half years)

See also

 List of Seventh-day Adventist colleges and universities
 Seventh-day Adventist education
 Seventh-day Adventist theology
 History of the Seventh-day Adventist Church
 Adventist Colleges and Universities
 Adventist University of Africa
 Education in Uganda
 List of universities in Uganda

References

External links
 Bugema University Homepage
My Adventist University Project

Universities and colleges in Uganda
Business schools in Uganda
Luweero District
Central Region, Uganda
1948 establishments in Uganda
Educational institutions established in 1948
Universities and colleges affiliated with the Seventh-day Adventist Church